La Foz is one of seven parishes (administrative divisions) in Morcín, a municipality within the province and autonomous community of Asturias, in northern Spain.

The Ethnographic Museum of Dairy is located in the parish.

Demography

Villages

References

Parishes in Morcin